The Connecting Link program is a provincial subsidy provided to municipalities to assist with road construction, maintenance and repairs in the Canadian province of Ontario. Roads which are designated as connecting links form the portions of provincial highways through built-up communities which are not owned by the Ministry of Transportation (MTO). Connecting links are governed by several regulations, including section 144, subsection 31.1 of the Highway Traffic Act and section 21 of the Public Transportation and Highway Improvement Act. While the road is under local control and can be modified to their needs, extensions and traffic signals require the approval of the MTO to be constructed.

The Connecting Link program was established in 1927. Today,  of roadway in 77 municipalities are maintained under the program. These links cross 70 bridges also maintained under the program.

In return for that particular road being downloaded, the town or county receives money and assistance in maintaining it, and is able to still sign and list it as a provincial highway, though not all connecting links are signed as provincial highways. Some (typically in cases of municipal streets urbanized before the provincial highway system existed) connecting links, however, were never provincial-maintained highways at all, but rather local streets or even county or regional roads that the town, city, county, or region has assistance in maintaining. 

During the large-scale downloading of many provincial highways in 1997, many connecting links were repealed when their parent highways were decommissioned. However, in some cases, where a highway terminated in a city, only the connecting links through the urbanized areas were repealed, while the rest of the highway remained under provincial jurisdiction. An example of this was Highway 10 through Mississauga and Brampton. In one unique case, Highway 11A, the entire highway was decommissioned as a result of it being a connecting link for its full length. 

Most connecting links are busy municipal or county roads that were once provincial highways, and are designated by small yellow squares or diamonds with the text "C/L" or "CL" on them at their start and end termini. These are similar to, but not always related to 7000-series highways.

Current links 
The following table lists the current connecting links in the province by highway.

See also 
 List of Ontario provincial highways
 County roads in Ontario

References

External links 
 

 Connecting Link